Torsten Flodén (1910-1948) was a Swedish screenwriter and lyricist.

Selected filmography
 Perhaps a Poet (1933)
 The Atlantic Adventure (1934)
 Shipwrecked Max (1936)
 Her Melody (1940)
 Hanna in Society (1940)
Lucky Young Lady (1941)
 How to Tame a Real Man (1941)
 Lasse-Maja (1941)
 Adventurer (1942)
 The Rose of Tistelön (1945)
 Meeting in the Night (1946)
 The Night Watchman's Wife (1947)

References

Bibliography 
 Rochelle Wright. The Visible Wall: Jews and Other Ethnic Outsiders in Swedish Film. SIU Press, 1998.

External links 
 

1910 births
1948 deaths
20th-century Swedish screenwriters
20th-century Swedish male writers